The list of spa towns lists national lists and various relevant spa towns around the world.

In Africa

Morocco

Moulay Yacoub

Ethiopia
Afar Region
Guder
Sodere
Ambo

South Africa
Caledon
 Tshipise
 Badplaas
 Bela Bela

In the Americas

Argentina
Termas de Río Hondo, Santiago del Estero Province

Brazil
Águas da Prata (São Paulo)
Águas de Chapecó (Santa Catarina)
Águas de Lindoia (São Paulo)
Águas de Santa Bárbara (São Paulo)
Águas de São Pedro (São Paulo)
Águas Mornas (Santa Catarina)
Araxá (Minas Gerais)
Caldas da Imperatriz (Santa Catarina)
Caldas Novas (Goiás)
Caxambu (Minas Gerais)
Piratuba (Santa Catarina)
Poços de Caldas (Minas Gerais)
São Lourenço (Minas Gerais)
Socorro (São Paulo)

Cuba
Arriete-Ciego Montero

Ecuador
Baños de Agua Santa, Tungurahua Province

El Salvador
Agua Caliente

Canada

Alberta
Banff Upper Hot Springs
Miette Hot Springs

British Columbia
Harrison Hot Springs
Radium Hot Springs
Fairmont Hot Springs
Halcyon Hot Springs
Ainsworth Hot Springs 
Nakusp Hot Springs
Canyon Hot Springs
Lussier Hot Springs
Ram Creek Hot Springs
Dewar Creek Hot Springs
Meager Creek Hot Spring
Skookumchuck Hot Springs/St. Agnes Well Hot Springs
Liard River Hot Springs
Mount Layton Hot Springs
Iskut River Hot Springs
Hotspring Island, Haida Gwaii
Hot Springs Cove, Vancouver Island
Ahousat Hot Springs

Ontario
Carlsbad Springs

United States
Eureka Springs, Arkansas
Hot Springs, Arkansas
Calistoga, California
Desert Hot Springs, California
Palm Springs, California
Paso Robles, California
Tecopa, California
Glenwood Springs, Colorado
Idaho Springs, Colorado
Ouray, Colorado
Pagosa Springs, Colorado
Warm Springs, Georgia
Lava Hot Springs, Idaho
French Lick, Indiana
Mount Clemens, Michigan
Hot Springs, Montana
Truth or Consequences, New Mexico
Massena, New York
Saratoga Springs, New York
Hot Springs, North Carolina
Yellow Springs, Ohio
Bedford, Pennsylvania
Cambridge Springs, Pennsylvania
Estill Springs, Tennessee
Hot Springs, Virginia
Berkeley Springs, West Virginia
White Sulphur Springs, West Virginia
Thermopolis, Wyoming

Costa Rica
 Rincon de la Vieja Volcano National Park
Tabacón

Jamaica
 Milk River Mineral Bath

Mexico
Agua Hedionda Spa
Puertecitos

Peru
Monterrey, Ancash
Chivay, Arequipa
Socosani, Arequipa
Baños del Inca, Cajamarca
Aguas Calientes, Cuzco

Uruguay
Termas del Arapey
Termas del Daymán
Termas de Guaviyú
Termas de San Nicanor
Termas de Almirón

In Asia

China

Anshan, Liaoning
Tianjin

Indonesia
Bali
Batam

Israel

Dead Sea
Eilat
Ein Bokek
Neve Zohar
Tiberias

Japan
"hot spring" is "Onsen" in Japanese
Beppu, Ōita
Hakone, Kanagawa
Gero, Gifu
Kobe, Kita-ku
Kusatsu, Gunma
Matsuyama, Ehime
Nagoya
Noboribetsu, Hokkaidō
Kinugawa, Nikkō
Takarazuka, Hyōgo
Yufuin, Oita

Malaysia
Poring, Sabah

Philippines
Calamba, Laguna
Los Baños, Laguna

South Korea
Chungju, Chungcheongbuk-do
Dongnae-gu, Busan
Gwangju, South Jeolla
Gyeongju, Gyeongsangbuk-do
Jeongeup, North Jeolla
Jungwon-gu, Gyeonggi-do
Mungyeong, Gyeongsangbuk-do
Onyang, Chungbuk
Pocheon, Gyeonggi
Seoul
Sokcho, Gangwon
Yuseong-gu, Daejeon

Taiwan
 Chiao Hsi
 Dakeng
 Beitou
 Jhiben
 Yangmingshan
 Guanziling
 Wulai
 Green island — undersea spas

Vietnam
Ba Vi, Hanoi
Bang Spa, Quang Binh
Binh Chau, Ba Ria
Kim Boi, Hoa Binh
Vinh Hao, Binh Thuan
Tan My, Ninh Thuan
Nha Trang

In Eurasia

Armenia
Arzni
Bjni
Dilijan
Jermuk
Tsaghkadzor

Azerbaijan
Bilgah
Istisu
Naftalan
Shikhovo

Cyprus
Ayia Napa
Larnaca
Limassol
Nicosia
Paphos

Georgia
Borjomi
Bakhmaro
Sairme
Tskhaltubo

Russia
Dagomys
Kislovodsk
Mineralnye Vody
Pyatigorsk
Zheleznovodsk
Nalchik
Belokurikha
Soligalich
Sochi
Staraya Russa
Yessentuki
Zelenogradsk
Marcial
Vladikavkaz
Inozemtsevo

Crimea
 Alupka
 Alushta
 Yevpatoria
 Feodosiya
 Foros
 Gaspra
 Kerch
 Koreiz
 Livadia
 Miskhor
 Partenit
 Simeiz
 Sudak
 Yalta

Turkey
Ayder
Afyon
Bursa
Çamlıhemşin
Çeşme
Denizli
Gönen
Istanbul
Kangal
Köyceğiz
Pamukkale
Sivas
Yalova

Tajikistan
Obi garm
Zumrad

In Europe

Andorra
Les Escaldes, parish of Escaldes-Engordany

Austria
Bad Aussee
Bad Bleiberg
Bad Blumau
Bad Erlach - Linsberg Asia
Bad Fischau-Brunn - Kristalltherme Bad Fischau
Bad Gastein - Felsentherme Gastein / Alpen Therme Gastein
Bad Geinberg
Bad Gleichenberg
Bad Hall - Tassilo Therme Bad Hall
Bad Ischl - Kaiser Therme Bad Ischl
Bad Kleinkirchheim - Thermal Römerbad / Therme St. Kathrein
Bad Kreuzen
Bad Lutzmannsburg - Sonnentherme Lutzmannsburg
Bad Radkersburg
Bad Sauerbrunn - Heiltherme Bad Sauerbrunn
Bad Schallerbach - Eurotherme Bad Schallerbach
Bad Tatzmannsdorf - Burgenlandtherme Bad Tatzmannsdorf
Bad Vigaun - St. Barbara Therme Bad Vigaun
Bad Vöslau - Thermalbad Bad Vöslau
Bad Waltersdorf
Baden bei Wien - Römertherme Baden
Fohnsdorf - Aqualux Therme Fohnsdorf
Köflach - Therme NOVA
Laa an der Thaya - Therme Laa
Längenfeld - Therme Aqua Dome Längenfeld
Loipersdorf
Moorbad Gmös
Sebersdorf - H2O Therme
Stegersbach
Villach - ThermenResort Warmbad-Villach
Wien Oberlaa

Belgium
Spa
Chaudfontaine
Ostend

Bosnia and Herzegovina
Banja Slatina, Slatina
Banja Vrućica, Teslić
Sarajevo
Medjugorje
Mostar
Dvorovi
Srebrenica

Bulgaria

Croatia
Bizovačke toplice, Bizovac
Crikvenica
Daruvarske toplice, Daruvar
Duga Uvala
Istarske toplice (Terme Istriane)
Terme Jezerčica, Donja Stubica
"Naftalan", Ivanić-Grad
Krapinske Toplice, Krapina
Lipik
Makarska
Selce
Šibenik
Sisak
Stubičke Toplice
Sutinske Toplice, Mače, Croatia
Toplice Topusko, Topusko
Tuheljske toplice, Tuhelj
Toplice Sveti Martin (Vučkovec) - Sveti Martin na Muri
Topusko
Varaždinske Toplice, Varaždin
Blato, Zagreb (planned)
Živaja

Czech Republic

Estonia
Haapsalu
Kuressaare
Narva-Jõesuu
Otepää
Pärnu
Toila
Värska

Finland
 Espoo
 Ikaalinen
 Imatra
 Joensuu
 Karjalohja
 Kittilä
 Kuopio
 Kuusamo
 Lappeenranta
 Leppävirta
 Naantali
 Nokia
 Oulu
 Pori
 Porvoo
 Rovaniemi
 Saarijärvi
 Savonlinna
 Tampere
 Turku
 Vaasa

France
List of spa towns in France

Germany
List of spa towns in Germany

Greece
List of spa towns in Greece
 Aidipsos, 
 Agkistro, Serres
 Kamena Vourla
 Kimolos
 Loutraki
 Loutra Kyllinis
 Sidirokastro, Serres
 Lakkos of Milos
 Loutrochori, Aridaia, Pella (Pozar)

Hungary

Republic of Ireland
Galway
Lisdoonvarna

Italy
Abano, Montegrotto, Battaglia Terme, Galzignano Terme (Padova)
Alghero, Castelsardo, Olbia, Santa Teresa Gallura,  (Sardinia)
Bagni di Tivoli, Tivoli, Lazio
Baiae (historical)
Bibione
Boario (Brescia)
Bormio
Caramanico Terme
Catania
 Cotilia (Rieti, Lazio)
Crodo
Fiuggi
Ischia
Maiori
Merano
Pantelleria
Premia
Pré-Saint-Didier
Recoaro Terme
Saint-Vincent, Aosta Valley
San Giuliano Terme
San Pellegrino Terme
Taormina
Termini Imerese
Terme di Valdieri (Cuneo)
Viterbo (Terme dei Papi and Bullicame)
Vulcano

Emilia Romagna
Bagno di Romagna
Brisighella
Bertinoro
Bologna
Castel San Pietro Terme
Castrocaro Terme
Cervarezza
Cervia
Monticelli Terme
Porretta Terme
Riccione
Rimini
Riolo Terme
Salsomaggiore Terme
Salvarola
Sant' Andrea Bagni
Tabiano

Marche
Acquasanta Terme
Camerano
Fano
Genga
Macerata Feltria
Monte Grimano
Petriano
Sarnano
Tolentino

Tuscany
Bagni di Lucca
Bagni di Pisa
Bagni San Filippo
Bagno Vignoni
Casciana Terme Lari
Castelnuovo Berardenga
Chianciano Terme
Equi Terme
Gambassi Terme
Impruneta
Monsummano Terme
Montecatini Terme
Montepulciano
Rapolano Terme
San Casciano dei Bagni
Sassetta
Saturnia
Sorano
Uliveto Terme
Venturina

Umbria
Città di Castello
Massa Martana
Sangemini
Spello

Latvia
Jūrmala
Ance

Lithuania
Druskininkai
Birštonas
Palanga

Macedonia
Negorski Banji
Banja Banishte
Banja Bansko
Banja Kežovica
Banja Car Samoil
Katlanovska Banja
Banja Kočani
Debarski Banji
Kumanovska Banja
Banja Strnovec

Moldova
Cahul
Călăraşi
Camenca
Hirjauca
Malovata
Orhei
Vadul lui Vodă

Poland

Portugal
Termas de Alcafache
Termas de Almeida Fonte Santa
Termas das Caldas de Aregos
Termas de Cabeço de Vide
Termas das Caldas da Rainha
Termas de Caldelas
Termas do Carapacho, Azores
Termas do Carvalhal, 
Termas de Chaves
Termas do Cró
Termas da Curia
Termas de Entre-os-Rios
Termas do Estoril
Termas das Caldas da Felgueira
Termas do Gerês
Termas da Ladeira de Envendos
Termas da Longroiva
Termas de Luso
Caldas de Manteigas
Termas de Melgaço
Caldas de Monchique
Termas de Monfortinho
Termas de Monte Real
Termas de Nisa
Termas de Pedras Salgadas
Termas de S. Jorge
Termas de Sangemil
Caldas Santas de Carvalhelhos
Termas de São Pedro do Sul
Termas de São Vicente
Caldas da Saúde
Caldas das Taipas
Termas de Unhais da Serra
Termas do Vale da Mó
Termas de Vidago
Termas do Vimeiro

Romania
Amara
Balvanyos
Bazna
Băile Felix
Băile Govora
Băile Herculane
Băile Olăneşti
Băile Tuşnad
Borsec
Buziaş
Călimăneşti-Căciulata
Cluj-Napoca
Covasna
Eforie Sud
Geoagiu
Iaşi-Nicolina
Lacu Sărat
Mangalia
Miercurea Sibiului
Moneasa
Neptun
Ocna Sibiului
Ocna Şugatag
Sângeorz-Băi
Sinaia
Slănic
Slănic Moldova
Sovata
Soveja
Stâna de Vale
Techirghiol
Turda
Tuşnad
Vatra Dornei
Voineasa

Serbia

Banja Koviljača
Bogutovačka Banja
Bujanovačka Banja
Bukovička Banja
Divčibare
Gamzigradska Banja
Gornja Trepča
Jošanička Banja
Kanjiža
Kuršumlijska Banja
Mataruška Banja
Niška Banja
Sijarinska Banja
Sokobanja
Vranjska Banja
Vrdnik
Vrnjačka Banja
Vrujci

Slovakia
 Bardejov, featuring also Bardejov - Družba
 Bojnice
 Brusno
 Číž
 Dudince, featuring also Dudince - Diamant
 Horný Smokovec
 
 Kováčová, featuring also Kováčová - Marína and Kováčová - Detvan
 Liptovský Ján
 Lúčivná
 Lúčky
 Nimnica
 Nový Smokovec, featuring also Nový Smokovec - Tatrasan
 Piešťany
 Rajecké Teplice
 Tatranská Lomnica sanatorium
 Sklené Teplice
 Sliač
 Smrdáky
 Štós
 Štrbské Pleso
 Tatranské Matliare
 Tatranské Zruby
 Trenčianske Teplice
 Turčianske Teplice
 Vyšné Ružbachy

Slovenia
Banovci
Bohinjska Bistrica
Čatež ob Savi
Dobrna
Dobova
Dolenjske Toplice
Laško
Lendava
Podčetrtek
Portorož
Ptuj
Radenci
Rogaška Slatina
Snovik
Strunjan
Šmarješke Toplice
Terme 3000 - Moravske Toplice
Topolšica
Zreče

Spain
Alange, Badajoz
Alcantud, Cuenca
Alhama de Aragon, Zaragoza
Alhama de Granada
Archena, Murcia
Arnedo, La Rioja
A Arnoia, Ourense
Beteta, Cuenca
Caldes de Malavella, Girona
Caldes de Montbui, Barcelona
Castro Caldelas, Pontevedra
Zestoa, Gipuzkoa
Chiclana de la Frontera, Cádiz
Fitero, Navarra
Fortuna, Murcia
Fuente-Olmedo, Valladolid
Guitiriz, Lugo
Lanjarón, Granada
Ledesma, Salamanca
Liérganes, Cantabria
Mondariz, Pontevedra
Illa da Toxa, Pontevedra
Panticosa, Huesca
Pechina, Almería
Peñarrubia, Cantabria
Puente Viesgo, Cantabria
Retortillo, Salamanca
Solares, Cantabria
Cuntis, Pontevedra

Switzerland
 Baden
 Bad Ragaz
 Davos
 Lavey-les-Bains
 Leukerbad
 Schinznach Bad
 Vals, Switzerland
 Yverdon-les-Bains
 Zurzach

Ukraine

Crimea
 Alupka
 Alushta
 Yevpatoria
 Feodosiya
 Foros
 Gaspra
 Kerch
 Koreiz
 Livadia
 Miskhor
 Partenit
 Simeiz
 Sudak
 Yalta

Regions 
 Berdyansk
 Kherson
 Skadovsk
 Khmelnik
 Kuyalnik
 Mirgorod
 Morshyn
 Skhidnytsia
 Transcarpathia
 Truskavets
 Zatoka

United Kingdom
List of spa towns in the United Kingdom

In Oceania

Australia
Daylesford Victorian Mineral Water Committee
Hepburn Springs Victorian Mineral Water Committee
Mornington Peninsula

New Zealand
Te Aroha, Waikato
Whitianga, Coromandel Peninsula 
Hanmer Springs
Maruia Springs
Rotorua
Taupo
Te Puia Springs
Waimangu
Waingaro
Waiwera
Parakai

See also

Spa town
Seaside resort
Resort architecture
List of conservation topics
Sauna
Day spa

 Spa towns, List of